Pacora is a town and corregimiento in Panamá District, Panamá Province, Panama located after Tocumen International Airport

It is regarded as the industrial area of Panama where many multinationals are moving for their logistics and industrial hub. More than 250 multinational from manufacturing to IT to services are moving there.

References

Populated places in Panamá Province
Corregimientos of Panamá Province
Panamá District